Hessa Reyadh Mohamed Jasim AlIsa (born 30 August 1995) is a Bahraini football, volleyball and futsal player who plays as an attacking midfielder for Saudi Arabian club Al Nassr in the Saudi Women's Premier League, the Bahrain women's national football team (The Red Ladies) and Bahrain women's national volleyball team.

Early life

Club career

Al-Riffa SC
Hessa AlIsa started playing football at Al-Riffa SC, a Bahraini club. She participated with the team in the inaugural 2019 WAFF Women's Clubs Championship, against clubs from UAE, Jordan, Lebanon, and Palestine. Hessa scored five goals in the tournament, helping her team finish fourth achieving one win, one draw, and two losses.

Salwa AlSabah
AlIsa got her first professional experience with Kuwaiti side Salwa Al-Sabah Club. She helped the team win the 2019/2020 league title.

Al MamlakaAl & Al Nassr
Alisa moved to Saudi Arabia to play for the Mamlaka WFC (Currently Al Nassr), competing in the first Saudi Women's Football Championship. she led her team to win the Championship after she contributed to a sweeping victory over the challenge WFC, with a score of seven to nil, by scoring five goals from the Sevens.
Hessa's contract was renewed after Al Nassr FC bought the team. starting the 2022–23 with a big win against Sama (18 to 0), AlIsa Scored her first super hat-trick in that match, after the 2nd match against Al Shabab FC Hessa managed to score two goals one of them was the equalizer.
AlIsa is now the Top goalscorer in the Premier League with 6 goals.

International career
AlIsa has been capped for Bahrain at the senior level in both football, volleyball, and futsal.

2019 WAFF Women's Championship, Bahrain
In January 2019, Alisa was named to the Bahrain women's squad to compete at the 2019 WAFF Women's Championship. After scoring two goals in the opening match against Lebanon and one goal against UAE and Palestine Respectively. she was named the tournament's Best player.

2019 GCC Women's Games, Kuwait
In 2019 Alisa was named to Bahrain's 2019 GCC Women's Games futsal squad. marking its debut in the Futsal team, she scored 7 goals in total. Bahrain emerged as the winner winning all matches.

Personal life
Hessa's Brother Naser Alisa is also a Football Player.

Hessa is a graduate of the Bahraini Royal University for Women in human resources.

Career statistics

International

Football

Futsal

Honours

Salwa AlSabah
Kuwaiti Women Futsal League: 
  Champions: 2019-20

Bahrain (Football)
WAFF Women's Championship:
  Runners-up: 2019

Al Mamlaka
Saudi Women's Premier League: 
  Champions: 2021-22

Bahrain (Futsal)
GCC Women's Games:
  Champions: 2019
GCC Games:
  Champions: 2022
WAFF Women's Futsal Championship:
  Third place: 2022

Individual
WAFF Women's Championship Best player: 2019

References

External links 
 
 
 

1995 births
Living people
Bahrain women's international footballers
Bahraini women's footballers
Saudi Women's Premier League players
Women's association footballers not categorized by position